Fabiana Udenio (born December 21, 1964) is an Italian-Argentine actress. Born in Argentina to Italian parents, she grew up in Rome. She is best known for her role as "Alotta Fagina", a Bond girl parody in the 1997 film Austin Powers: International Man of Mystery.

Early life
Fabiana Udenio was born in Buenos Aires, Argentina, and moved to Italy, where she was crowned "Miss Teen Italy" at the age of thirteen. That same year Fabiana made her theatre debut as Miranda in a production of The Tempest directed by Giorgio Strehler. She began acting in films and television as a teenager.

Career
Udenio's film roles include playing the daughter of a World War II Resistance fighter in The Scarlet and the Black, Italian foreign-exchange student Anna-Maria Mazarelli in Summer School (1987), the sunbather in the "Sunblock 5000" commercial within RoboCop 2 (1990), Dan Cain's only living girlfriend Francesca in Bride of Re-Animator (1990), as "Alotta Fagina" in Austin Powers: International Man of Mystery (1997), as "Don Na" in The Godson (1998), and Gabriella in Pauly Shore's film In The Army Now (1994).

On television, Udenio had the recurring role of "Giulietta" on the ABC soap opera One Life to Live from 1985 to 1986, and was a regular cast member in the Peter Benchley syndicated drama Amazon (1999–2000). She has guest starred and had recurring roles on dozens of television shows, including Babylon 5, Baywatch, Full House, NYPD Blue, Quantum Leap, Mortal Kombat: Conquest, Cheers, Mad About You, Wings, The Magnificent Seven, CSI: Miami, and Mistresses. She also had the recurring role on 90210 (2008–2011) of Atooza Shirazi. 

She appeared in the recurring role of Elena Di Nola/Mutter in the critically acclaimed series Jane the Virgin (2015–2016).

Fabiana is soon appearing as a series regular in Arnold Schwarzenegger's action-comedy series for Netflix FUBAR (TV series).

Personal life
Fabiana Udenio was married to actor Judson Scott, who she met in New York on the set of the soap opera One Life to Live.

Udenio was later married to real estate developer Robert F. MacLeod jr. for four years. She filed for divorce on February 5, 2009, citing irreconcilable differences. 
They have a son named Adrian Raice MacLeod.

Selected filmography

Passion Flower Hotel (1978) – Gina
The Warning (1980)
The Scarlet and the Black  (1983) – Guila Lombardo
Hardbodies 2 (1986) – Cleo / Princess
Summer School (1987) – Anna-Maria Mazarelli
Full House (1987) - Adrianna (episode "Daddy's Home")
Cheers (1989) - Season 7 "The Visiting Lecher" - Maid
Bride of Re-Animator (1989) – Francesca Danelli
Quantum Leap (1990) - Eva Panzini (episode "Leaping in Without a Net")
RoboCop 2 (1990) – Sunblock Woman
Diplomatic Immunity (1991) – Teresa Escobal
Anni 90 (1992) – Daniela ("Un amore impossibile")
Journey to the Center of the Earth (1993) – Sandra Miller
Baywatch (1993) – Lena Fiori
 Babylon 5 (1994 & 1998) – Adira Tyree
In the Army Now (1994) – Gabriella
Austin Powers: International Man of Mystery (1997) – Alotta Fagina
The Godson (1998) – Don Na
Amazon (1999-2000, TV Series) – Pia Claire
The Wedding Planner (2001) – Anna Bosco
Slammed (2004) – Natasha
FUBAR (2023) - Tally

References

External links
 
 

Actresses from Rome
Argentine film actresses
Argentine people of Italian descent
Argentine soap opera actresses
Argentine television actresses
Italian film actresses
Italian television actresses
Living people
Actresses from Buenos Aires
20th-century Argentine actresses
20th-century Italian actresses
21st-century Argentine actresses
21st-century Italian actresses
1964 births
Argentine emigrants to Italy